In mathematics, an initial algebra is an initial object in the category of -algebras for a given endofunctor . This initiality provides a general framework for induction and recursion.

Examples

Functor  
An algebra for this endofunctor is a set  (called the carrier of the algebra) together with a function . Defining such a function amounts to defining a point  and a function .
Define
 
and

Then the set  of natural numbers together with the function  is an initial -algebra.

The set of natural numbers is the carrier of an initial algebra for this functor: the point is zero and the function is the successor function.

Functor  

For a second example, consider the endofunctor  on the category of sets, where  is the set of natural numbers. An algebra for this endofunctor is a set  together with a function . To define such a function, we need a point  and a function . The set of finite lists of natural numbers is an initial algebra for this functor. The point is the empty list, and the function is cons, taking a number and a finite list, and returning a new finite list with the number at the head.

In categories with binary coproducts, the definitions just given are equivalent to the usual definitions of a natural number object and a list object, respectively.

Final coalgebra
Dually, a final coalgebra is a terminal object in the category of -coalgebras. The finality provides a general framework for coinduction and corecursion.

For example, using the same functor  as before, a coalgebra is defined as a set  together with a function . With this in view, the set  consisting of the set of natural numbers extended with a new element  is the carrier of the final coalgebra in the category, where  is the predecessor function (the inverse of the successor function) on the positive naturals, but acts like the identity on the new element : , .

For a second example, consider the same functor  as before. In this case the carrier of the final coalgebra consists of all lists of natural numbers, finite as well as infinite. The operations are a test function testing whether a list is empty, and a deconstruction function defined on non-empty lists returning a pair consisting of the head and the tail of the input list.

 Theorems 
 Initial algebras are minimal (i.e., have no proper subalgebra).
 Final coalgebras are simple (i.e., have no proper quotients).

 Use in computer science 

Various finite data structures used in programming, such as lists and trees, can be obtained as initial algebras of specific endofunctors.
While there may be several initial algebras for a given endofunctor, they are unique up to isomorphism, which informally means that the "observable" properties of a data structure can be adequately captured by defining it as an initial algebra.

To obtain the type  of lists whose elements are members of set , consider that the list-forming operations are:

Combined into one function, they give:

It is, in fact, the initial -algebra. Initiality is established by the function known as foldr'' in functional programming languages such as Haskell and ML.

Likewise, binary trees with elements at the leaves can be obtained as the initial algebra

Types obtained this way are known as algebraic data types.

Types defined by using least fixed point construct with functor  can be regarded as an initial -algebra, provided that parametricity holds for the type.

In a dual way, similar relationship exists between notions of greatest fixed point and terminal -coalgebra, with applications to coinductive types.  These can be used for allowing potentially infinite objects while maintaining strong normalization property. In the strongly normalizing (each program terminates) Charity programming language, coinductive data types can be used for achieving surprising results, e.g. defining lookup constructs to implement such “strong” functions like the Ackermann function.

See also 
 Algebraic data type
 Catamorphism
 Anamorphism

Notes

External links 
 Categorical programming with inductive and coinductive types by Varmo Vene 
 Recursive types for free! by Philip Wadler, University of Glasgow, 1990-2014.
 Initial Algebra and Final Coalgebra Semantics for Concurrency by  J.J.M.M. Rutten and D. Turi
 Initiality and finality from CLiki
 Typed Tagless Final Interpreters by Oleg Kiselyov

Category theory
Functional programming
Type theory